Jelling municipality was, from 1970 until 1 January 2007, a municipality (Danish: kommune) in Vejle County on the Jutland peninsula in south-west Denmark. In 2007 it merged into the newly formed Vejle municipality.

History
The Jelling municipality covered an area of 89 km2, and had a total population of 5,697 (2005). Its last mayor was Arne H. Sigtenbjerggaard, a member of the Venstre (Liberal Party) political party. The main town and the site of its municipal council was the town of Jelling.

 Hvejsel Parish
 Jelling Parish
 Kollerup Parish
 Vindelev Parish

Merger
Jelling municipality ceased to exist as the result of Kommunalreformen ("The Municipality Reform" of 2007).  It was merged with Børkop, Egtved, Give, and Vejle municipalities to form a new Vejle municipality.  This created a municipality with an area of 1,055 km2 and a total population of 82,935 (2005).  The new municipality belongs to Region of Southern Denmark.

Features
Located in the former Jelling municipality are the runic gravestones— the Jelling stones, the burial mounds, and church which became a UNESCO World Heritage Site in 1994.

External links 
 Vejle municipality's official website 
 Jelling Stones at the World Heritage (UNESCO) website

References 
 Municipal statistics: NetBorger Kommunefakta, delivered from KMD aka Kommunedata (Municipal Data)
 Municipal mergers and neighbors: Eniro new municipalities map

Former municipalities of Denmark